The Sarajishvili is a station on the Akhmeteli–Varketili Line (First Line) of the Tbilisi Metro. It opened on January 7, 1989. The station is named after the Georgian scientist, entrepreneur, and philanthropist Davit Sarajishvili (1848–1911).

References

External links
 Sarajishvili metro station page at Tbilisi Municipal Portal (Archived)

Tbilisi Metro stations
Railway stations opened in 1989
1989 establishments in Georgia (country)